OpenEye Scientific Software is an American software company founded by Anthony Nicholls in 1997. It develops large-scale molecular modelling applications and toolkits. In July 2022, Cadence Design Systems agreed to acquire OpenEye for $500million in cash.

Scope
Primarily geared towards drug discovery and design, areas of application include conformation generation, docking, shape comparison, charge/electrostatics, cheminformatics and visualization. The software is designed for scientific rigor, as well as speed, scalability and platform independence.

OpenEye makes much of its technology available as toolkits suitable for custom development. The toolkits are available in multiple languages: C++, Python, Java and C#.

Application software
 AFITT - Crystallographic refinement and analysis.
 BROOD - Bioisostere identification using shape, chemistry and electrostatic similarity.
 EON - Chemical similarity analysis via comparison of electrostatics overlay.
 FastROCS - Real-time 3D molecular shape searches, using GPU technology.
 FILTER - Molecular screening and selection based on physical property or functional group.
 OEDocking - Molecular docking tools including FRED (fast docking), HYBRID (ligand guided docking) and POSIT (ligand guided pose prediction).
 OMEGA - Fast, accurate conformer generation, for linear and macrocyclic molecules.
 pKa Prospector - A database of high quality pKa measurements.
 QUACPAC - Tautomers, protonation states and charges for small molecules and proteins.
 ROCS - Chemical similarity analysis via rapid 3D molecular shape searches.
 SZMAP - Identify water sites in a protein binding site for improving ligand potency.
 SZYBKI - Fast forcefield optimization of ligands in gas-phase, solution, or within a protein active site.
 VIDA - Graphical user interface that visualizes, analyzes and manages corporate collections of molecular structures and information.

Toolkits
Programming libraries providing other applications with object-oriented accessibility to a given set of capabilities.

 OEChem TK - Cheminformatics and 3D molecular data handling.
 OEDepict TK - Elegant 2D structure rendering of compounds.
 OEDocking TK - Docking and scoring.
 Grapheme TK - Advanced structure rendering of compounds.
 GraphSim TK - 2D molecular fingerprints and similarity calculations.
 Lexichem TK - State-of-the-art compound name and structure interconversion with support for multiple languages.
 MolProp TK - 2D molecular property calculation and filtering.
 QuacPac TK - Tautomer generation.
 Omega TK - Conformer generation.
 Shape TK - Molecular shape comparisons based on 3D overlays.
 Spicoli TK - Rapid molecular surface generation and manipulation.
 Szmap TK - Water interactions in the binding site.
 Szykbi TK - Generalized function optimization, e.g. molecular structure optimization.
 Zap TK - An efficient Poisson-Boltzmann electrostatics solver.

See also

 Computational chemistry

References

External links
 

Biotechnology companies of the United States
Companies based in Santa Fe, New Mexico
American corporate subsidiaries
Software companies based in New Mexico
Software companies established in 1997
Software companies of the United States
2022 mergers and acquisitions